Amberger is a surname. Notable people with the surname include:

Charles Amberger (1882–1901), French cyclist
Christoph Amberger (c. 1505 – 1562), German painter
Eloise Amberger (born 1987), Australian synchronized swimmer
Georg Amberger (1890–1949), German middle-distance runner